Christian Prouteau (born on the 7 April 1944) is a French officer of the Gendarmerie Nationale. He was involved in the organisation of the GIGN and the GSPR.

Biography 
Prouteau graduated from Saint-Cyr, the French army's officers' school, in 1969. After a stint in the army, he transferred to the National Gendarmerie and graduated from École des officiers de la gendarmerie nationale, the Gendarmerie's Officers school. Posted to a Mobile Gendarmerie squadron (ie troop) he became an instructor in commando techniques. In 1973, in response to the Munich massacre, French authorities decided to create an elite unit capable of countering acts of terrorism. Prouteau was selected to organise GIGN.

Prouteau lead GIGN for 9 years, leading 64 interventions. He was severely wounded in 1980.

From 1982 to 1988, Prouteau directed the 'Anti-terrorist Cell' of the Élysée which was involved in the Élysée wiretap scandal and the "Irish of Vincennes" affair. Relaxed for the "Irish of Vincennes" case in 2002, he was found guilty in 2005, received a suspended eight-month sentence and fined 5000 Euros for his involvement in the wiretap scandal.

Prouteau organised the security of the 1992 Winter Olympics.

He was appointed a préfet hors cadre (a prefect not attached to any particular prefecture) in March 1985.

Since retirement in 2009, he has been active as a television consultant and in various organizations (including the association of the former GIGN members).

References

External links 
   Christian PROUTEAU, gign.org

Officers of the National Gendarmerie
Living people
1944 births
École Spéciale Militaire de Saint-Cyr alumni